EKO Cobra ("Task Force Cobra") is the police tactical unit of the Austrian Federal Ministry of the Interior. EKO Cobra is not part of the Austrian Federal Police, but instead is directly under the control of the Federal Ministry of the Interior.

History

The roots of the EKO Cobra lie in the Gendarmerieeinsatzkommando Bad Vöslau that was originally formed by the regional police authority of Lower Austria to protect East European Jews during their migration via Austria to Israel against terrorist threats. As the tactical skills of this unit were welcome in other fields, too, the mission of the Gendarmerieeinsatzkommando became broader in the course of years, and it climbed the hierarchy, from being a regional unit to becoming assigned directly to the Generaldirektion für öffentliche Sicherheit, the leading authority for public security within the Ministry of the Interior.

The name Cobra was coined by the press. It was a reference to the US TV series Mission: Impossible, which was aired in German under the title Kobra, übernehmen Sie. It first appeared in June 1973 in the Kronen Zeitung.

The determining step of founding today's Cobra as a unit of the Ministry of the Interior rather than a regional police unit was done in 1978, primarily as a response to the Munich massacre attack on Israeli athletes at the 1972 Munich Olympics. Its main office is in Wiener Neustadt, with sub-offices in Graz, Linz, Salzburg, and Innsbruck. GSG-9 and Sayeret Matkal trained the first operators of the GEK.

The Federal Ministry of the Interior changed the unit's name from GEK to EKO Cobra in 2002.

The 450 men of EKO Cobra have trained with some of the most elite special forces units.

Known operations
EKO Cobra was involved in a hostage rescue in the Graz-Karlau Prison in 1996, and numerous other operations. Although it has never participated in the same type of hostage rescue operations that the HRT, GIGN, GIS, NSG, ERU, GSG 9, and the SAS have had, the EKO Cobra is the only Counter-Terrorism unit to end a hijacking while the aircraft was still in the air. On 17 October 1996, four Cobra officers were on board an Aeroflot Tupolev Tu-154 escorting deported prisoners to Lagos when a Nigerian man threatened the cockpit crew with a knife and demanded a diversion to Germany or South Africa. The team overpowered the man and handed him over to authorities after landing.

In the course of the 2006 Lebanon War EKO Cobra assisted in the evacuation of Austrians and other EU citizens from Lebanon.

135 EKO Cobra operatives together with units of the Austrian Armed Forces were involved in the search for Alois Huber in the Annaberg shooting, who killed three police officers and one Red Cross EMT on 17 September 2013, in Lower Austria.

In 2016, 42 officers supported the German Police in the Munich shooting.

In 2017, 20 EKO Cobra operatives were directly involved to end the severe riots in the Schanzenviertel area during the G20 Hamburg summit, three operatives were wounded.

EKO Cobra also is assisting in the manhunt of the remaining suspect who was involved in the 2020 Vienna attack.

Recruitment and training

Any member of the Austrian Federal Police may apply to the EKO Cobra. 
The tests consist of medical examinations, psychological tests, and vigorous physical tests.
Upon successful completion of the tests the recruits attend 6 months of specialized training which includes marksmanship, tactical training, sports, driver courses, abseiling/rappelling, hand-to-hand combat, language classes, etc. Besides the courses taught in the basic training, further specialization is possible in fields, such as parachuting, diving, explosives, or sniping.

Since its establishment in 1978, 1,140 officers have served in EKO Cobra.

Organization

The unit's headquarters is located in Wiener Neustadt (Lower Austria). It performs all administrative activities and the training for the EKO Cobra officers. Further departments exist in Vienna, Graz, Linz, and Innsbruck with small field offices in Klagenfurt, Salzburg, and Feldkirch.

Each department contains four teams and each field office contains two. This structure allows the units to be deployed anywhere in Austria in under 70 minutes.

On 1 April 2013, EKO Cobra was merged in the newly established Special Operations Directorate - DSE (Direktion für Spezialeinheiten ). This organisation serves as a unified command for the units with special tasks of the Austrian Federal Police.

Further units of the DSE are the police's bomb disposal units, the observation units and special investigative units.

Equipment

Weapons

EKO Cobra is armed mainly with Austrian weaponry, but sometimes foreign-produced arms are used too.

Special equipment
EKO Cobra use a variety of equipment designed for a variety of situations.
Protective gear made of kevlar or ceramic
 Balaclavas
 Camouflage suits
 Tonfa batons
 OC sprays

Uniforms
EKO Cobra officers wear the uniform of the Austrian Federal Police with certain modifications:
 Maroon beret to indicate their elite status
 The unit's insignia is worn instead of the police insignia
 The rank insignia's background is black instead of red as from the regular Federal Police uniforms
During tactical operations the officers wear green or black coveralls along with their tactical gear.

Annual Warrior Competition 
EKO Cobra competed in the 2011 Annual Warrior Competition winning top honors. EKO Cobra defeated a United States Marine Corps 13th MEU and a joint team from U.S. Army Special Forces 5th Group and Jordan SFG 101 among many others.

Ranks 

These are the former ranks of EKO Cobra, before the current standard rank insignia were adopted in 2015.

References

Bibliography

External links

 Official website 

1978 establishments in Austria
ATLAS Network
Police tactical units
Special forces of Austria